Coleraine is a former United Kingdom Parliament constituency, in Ireland, returning one MP. It was an original constituency represented in Parliament when the Union of Great Britain and Ireland took effect on 1 January 1801.

Boundaries
This constituency was the parliamentary borough of Coleraine in County Londonderry.

Members of Parliament

Election results

Elections in the 1830s

 Inhabitants were allowed to "tender" votes, with 2 being granted to Brydges and 15 for Thorp. However, just 22 votes of the corporation were accepted. Petitions and counter-petitions over whether the franchise extended to freemen were lodged, but both lapsed ahead of the 1831 election.

 Again, inhabitants were allowed to tender votes, with 1 being cast for Brydges and 70 for Copeland, but these were rejected, and just 16 from the corporation in favour of Brydges were accepted. A petition was again lodged and, after lengthy committee proceedings in the House of Commons, it was agreed that 23 of the 70 tendered votes from those who had been admitted as freeman in 1797 were accepted. Copeland was then declared elected.

 The candidates initially had 97 votes apiece, but the mayor cast a deciding vote in favour of Beresford. A petition was again lodged and a Commons committee again ruled in favour of the freemen and seated Copeland on 27 May 1833.

Elections in the 1840s

Litton resigned after being appointed Master of Chancery in Ireland, causing a by-election.

Elections in the 1850s
Boyd resigned by accepting the office of Steward of the Chiltern Hundreds, causing a by-election.

Elections in the 1860s
Boyd's death caused a by-election.

Elections in the 1870s

Elections in the 1880s

References

The Parliaments of England by Henry Stooks Smith (1st edition published in three volumes 1844–50), 2nd edition edited (in one volume) by F.W.S. Craig (Political Reference Publications 1973)

Westminster constituencies in County Londonderry (historic)
Constituencies of the Parliament of the United Kingdom established in 1801
Constituencies of the Parliament of the United Kingdom disestablished in 1885
Coleraine